The 1977 Essex County Council election took place on 5 May 1977 to elect members of Essex County Council in England. This was on the same day as other local elections.

Summary

|}

References

1977
1977 English local elections
1970s in Essex